Zhang Chang  may refer to:

 Zhang Chang (swimmer), swimmer who competed at the 2007 World Aquatics Championships
 Zhang Chang (Han), Han Dynasty official
 Zhang Chang (Jin dynasty), Jin dynasty rebel